Butyricicoccus  is a bacterial genus from the family of Oscillospiraceae., formerly ranked in the family of Clostridiaceae.

References

Further reading 
 
 
 

Clostridiaceae
Bacteria genera